Tere Mere Sapne is a 1996 Indian Hindi-language romantic drama film produced by Amitabh Bachchan's production company A. B. C. L. and directed by Joy Augustine. The film had a cast of newcomer actors consisting of Arshad Warsi, Chandrachur Singh, Priya Gill and Simran.

Plot
The plot of the movie is broadly similar to Mark Twain's The Prince and the Pauper. Two boys are born on the same day. One is Rahul Mehta, born with a silver spoon in his mouth to a rich family in England; another is Baalu, born in a middle-class Brahmin family somewhere in Mumbai. Both grow up until they are destined to exchange places on their 21st birthday.

Rahul's parents died when he was young, and he lives with his grandfather Shambunath Mehta. He wants to visit India to see his parents' graves though his grandfather doesn't want him to go. He is afraid Rahul may fall in love and ruin himself as his parents did. With much persuasion, he comes to India and manages to escape his guardians, Ram Singh and detective Mirchandani, at the airport and catches a taxi.

The driver of the taxi is none other than Baalu who, not knowing Rahul's true identity, keeps cursing the rich guy for being born on the same day as him and enjoying the wealthy life. Later, Rahul discloses his identity and Baalu feels ashamed, but both become good friends.

Rahul does not want to go back to his wealth-ridden world, so he asks Baalu to take his place and let him take Baalu's place. So, Rahul becomes the taxi driver and informs Ram Singh that someone will be coming to them in his place. Baalu reaches the hotel, and Ram Singh has a tough time grooming Baalu to behave like a rich guy.

Rahul goes to Baalu's place where he finds Baalu's sister Paro and falls in love with her. Baalu, while attending a meeting with V. P. Mathur, who is the caretaker of Mehta Industries in India, meets Mathur's daughter Pooja and falls in love with her.

Mehta industries are in shambles because of corrupt managers. The union leader Dattabhau explains this to Baalu (disguised as Rahul). Baalu takes care of this and reopens the company, declaring equal profit sharing among labourers.

At the Shastri's place, Paro's father P. V. Shastri learns of Rahul and Paro's love affair and is enraged since Rahul is a Christian. Baalu comes into the picture and pacifies the situation. Rahul decides to turn into a Brahmin so that he can marry Paro.

Rahul's grandfather in UK learns what is happening with Rahul and comes to India to control the situation. However, since the control of Mehta Industries has gone out of the Mathurs' hands, they decide to kill Rahul and Shambhunath. Rahul and Baalu fight to save Shambhuath from the gangster hired by the Mathurs to kill him.

The movie ends with Rahul's marriage with Paro and Baalu's marriage with Pooja.

Cast
 Arshad Warsi as Baalu Shastri
 Chandrachur Singh as Rahul Mehta
 Priya Gill as Paro Shastri
 Simran as Pooja Mathur
 Pran as Shambunath Mehta, Rahul's grandfather
 Sulbha Arya as Mrs. Shastri
 Bal Dhuri as Ram Singh, Rahul's caretaker
 Suresh Malhotra as V. P. Mathur
 Navtej Hundal as Senior Brahmin Pundit
 Pappu Polyester as S. C. Mathur
 Manoj Pahwa as Detective Mirchandani
 K. D. Chandran as P. V. Shastri
 A. K. Hangal as Dattabhau 
 Master Frank Anthony as Murli

Music
The music was composed by Viju Shah, with lyrics by Anand Bakshi. The soundtrack album, released by Big B, sold 2.2million units in India, making it the ninth best-selling Bollywood soundtrack of 1996.

Reception
Box Office India declared the film a HIT.

References

External links
 

1990s Hindi-language films
1996 films
1990s action comedy-drama films
Films based on The Prince and the Pauper
Films scored by Viju Shah
Indian action comedy-drama films
1996 romantic comedy-drama films
Indian romantic comedy-drama films